Gabriel IV (Greek: Γαβριήλ Δ΄), (? – 29 June 1785) served as Ecumenical Patriarch of Constantinople during the period 1780–1785.

Biography 
Gabriel was born in Smyrna and descended from an aristocratic family. He was bishop of the Ayvalık Islands and later metropolitan bishop of Ioannina until April 1771 when he became Metropolitan of Old Patras. He especially liked the ecclesiastic order and precedence.

In 1780, he was elected Ecumenical Patriarch of Constantinople. During his patriarchy, he restored Athanasios Parios, who had been deposed because of the dispute about the kollyva and the memorial service. In 1784, he published the Typikon of Mount Athos, which delimited the administrative and executive domains of its organs.

He died on 29 June 1785 and was buried in the same grave as his predecessor, Sophronius II, in the yard of the Church of the Asomatoi (Pammegiston Taxiarchon) in Arnavutköy.

Sources 
 Οικουμενικό Πατριαρχείο
 Ιερά Μητρόπολις Πατρών: «Ο Οικουμενικός Πατριάρχης και η Πάτρα», άρθρο του ιστορικού Κώστα Ν. Τριανταφύλλου στην εφημερίδα «Πελοπόννησος» (19/10/2000)

References 

1785 deaths
Bishops of Ioannina
18th-century Ecumenical Patriarchs of Constantinople
Orthodox bishops of Patras
Smyrniote Greeks